Tony Moorey is programme manager at Absolute Radio. He used to be the producer of The Geoff Show on  Virgin Radio (before it was renamed "Absolute") where he, Geoff Lloyd and Annabel Port made up the 'Symposium', until 21 December 2007. He was replaced by Nelson Kumah. Until 2005, he was producer of the Pete and Geoff Breakfast Show, where he also worked with Geoff Lloyd and Annabel Port.

Biography

Anthony Moorey was born in Wythenshawe Hospital, Manchester on 26 September 1974.

It was after listening to broadcaster James H Reeve that Tony decided he wanted to work in radio.

His first step on this career was at Piccadilly Radio in Manchester.

In 1998, after various production jobs at Piccadilly he found a job at the BBC in London making trails for Edwina Currie, Dominik Diamond, David Mellor and other programmes on Radio Five Live. He also commissioned music from, among others, New Order.

Work on The Geoff Show
In the summer of 2002, Moorey started work at Virgin Radio producing the Pete & Geoff Drivetime show. Highlights included outside broadcasts in Las Vegas, on the London Eye and in Lisbon for Euro 2004.

Moorey had his own feature on the show called The Dead of the Night where he told the life story of someone from history and then invited Geoff, Annabel and the listeners to guess how this person met their end. He also had a feature called 'Night Fever' where he described the symptoms of a medical ailment and people rung in trying to guess what that ailment was. If they got it right they won a first aid kit and another prize. Moorey also contributed phone-in topics for the night, with his topic typically being slightly more sensible in comparison to Port's and Lloyd's suggested topics.

He left The Geoff Show on 21 December 2007, to pursue a new career opportunity at Virgin Radio. His replacement Nelson Kumah started on 5 January 2008 and appeared on the show as the new producer.

References

Living people
Virgin Radio (UK)
British radio personalities
1974 births